The International Socialist League is a small Trotskyist organisation in the UK.

The group's origins lie in the disintegration of the Workers' Revolutionary Party (WRP) in the 1980s. It was founded as the Bolshevik Faction of Cliff Slaughter's WRP in August 1987 and from the start was sympathetic to the Latin American-based Trotskyist leader Nahuel Moreno.

In February 1988 the future ISL split from the WRP and under the leadership of the veteran Bill Hunter and Martin Ralph founded their organisation, which affiliated to Moreno's International Workers League (LIT).

The ISL remains active in the North West of England, London, South Wales and the East of England and was active in the Socialist Alliance. It was supportive of the Socialist Alliance Democracy Platform, the Merseyside-based United Socialist Party, and the TUSC. It is currently active in Liverpool as part of Old Swan Against The Cuts (OSAC); Martin Ralph stood as the OSAC candidate in the May 2014 council election, polling third in Old Swan with 8.5%, and stood again in 2015, gaining 6%, in a general election in which the ISL urged support for TUSC and Left Unity candidates across the country.

Bill Hunter died in July 2015.

References

External links
National website
International website

International Workers League – Fourth International
Political parties established in 1998
Trotskyist organisations in the United Kingdom
1987 establishments in the United Kingdom
Workers Revolutionary Party (UK)